The 1988 Lehigh Engineers football team was an American football team that represented Lehigh University during the 1988 NCAA Division I-AA football season. Lehigh tied for third in the Colonial League. 

In their third year under head coach Hank Small, the Engineers compiled a 6–5 record. Rich Curtis and Gregg Wolfson were the team captains.

The Engineers outscored opponents 351 to 300. Their 2–3 conference record placed Lehigh in a three-way tie for third (and for next-to-last) in the six-team Colonial League standings.

Lehigh played its first year of home games at Murray H. Goodman Stadium on the university's new Goodman Campus in Bethlehem, Pennsylvania.

Schedule

References

Lehigh
Lehigh Mountain Hawks football seasons
Lehigh Engineers football